The Chetco River is a  stream located in the southwestern portion of the U.S. state of Oregon. Except for the lowermost , the river is located entirely within the Rogue River – Siskiyou National Forest. The river rises in the Kalmiopsis Wilderness, northwest of Chetco Peak at the junction of the Oregon Coast Range and the Klamath Mountains. The Chetco River's watershed remains largely undeveloped, protected by the Rogue River – Siskiyou National Forest and the Kalmiopsis Wilderness. The upper  of the river have been designated Wild and Scenic since 1988.

Native Americans have lived in the Chetco River's watershed for the last one to three thousand years. Several explorers, including Sir Francis Drake, George Vancouver, and Jedediah Smith, visited the region between the 16th and 19th centuries, and found the Chetco people inhabiting the area. Non-indigenous settlers arrived soon after gold and other precious metals were discovered in the 1840s and 1850s. The town of Brookings was founded in the early 20th century, and incorporated in 1951. Fourteen thousand residents of Brookings and Harbor rely on the Chetco for drinking water.

Supporting a large population of salmon and trout, the Chetco's water is of very high quality. The watershed is home to many other species, including several that are endemic to the Siskiyou Mountains area. The northernmost grove of Redwoods—the tallest trees on Earth—grow in the southern region of the Chetco's drainage basin. In total, the river is home to over 200 species of animals, and 97 percent of the watershed is forested.

Course
It flows north, gathering small tributaries such as the Little Chetco River and Babyfoot Creek. The river turns west near the  Pearsoll Peak, the highest point in the watershed. It receives Box Canyon Creek on the left bank, Tincup Creek on the right bank, and Boulder Creek on the left. It then flows south, gathering the South Fork Chetco River. A few miles farther south, the river passes through a Redwood grove. It flows between Bosley Butte to the north and Mount Emily to the south; the latter is the impact site of one of only four bombs known to have been dropped in the continental United States by an enemy aircraft. This occurred during the Lookout Air Raids of 1942.

Turning southwest, the river flows through Alfred A. Loeb State Park and collects the North Fork Chetco River on the right at river mile (RM) 5 (or river kilometer (RK) 8). It passes through the communities of Brookings to the north and Harbor to the south, and discharges into the Pacific Ocean.

Discharge
It opened in 1969, and continues to operate.

Watershed

The Chetco River drains  of the southern Oregon Coast. About 78 percent is owned by the United States Forest Service, and another 5 percent is owned by the Bureau of Land Management. Sixteen percent is privately owned, while the remaining one percent is managed by the cities of Brookings and Harbor, Curry County, and the state of Oregon. Approximately 97 percent of the land is used for forestry, 2 percent for agriculture and rural areas, and 1 percent is urban. Gravel and minerals are mined from the lower and upper regions of the watershed, respectively.

The region is mostly mountainous, characterized by steep river valleys. Seventy percent of surface runoff is collected from rain, and 30 percent from rain on snow. Twenty-five separate wetlands totaling  have been identified in the watershed. The increase in temperature is caused by the geography of the region; cool air funnels down the Chetco River valley from the Siskiyou and Coast ranges, gradually heating up before eventually reaching Brookings as a warm wind. The mountains also shield the area from cool marine layers. Partially as a result of this phenomenon, Brookings recorded its highest temperature ever, on July 8, 2008.

Earthquakes are common, and large-scale ones occur around every 300 years. The Cascadia earthquake of 1700—estimated at 8.7–9.2 on the moment magnitude scale—caused a tsunami to sweep across California, Oregon, Washington, and British Columbia, reaching Japan the next day. Another major earthquake occurred in 1873 near present-day Brookings. With a magnitude of 7.3, the quake was felt from Seattle to San Francisco. The Columbus Day Storm of 1962 brought devastating winds to nearly all of Oregon; nearby Port Orford recorded gusts exceeding . The storm killed 38 people across the state and caused over $200 million worth of damage. The watershed often experiences wildfires, some of them major.

As of the 2010 census, the city of Brookings had a population of 6,336, while nearby Harbor had 2,391. In total, over 14,000 residents of the Brookings–Harbor area depend on the Chetco River for drinking water. Nearby watersheds include the Winchuck and Smith rivers to the south, the Pistol River to the north, and the Illinois River, a tributary of the Rogue River, to the north and east.

Flora and fauna

The Chetco River watershed is covered primarily by temperate coniferous forest, which includes species such as Douglas fir, western hemlock, white fir, Port Orford cedar, California incense cedar, and Sitka spruce. Jeffrey pine, knobcone pine, and golden chinquapin have also been identified. Hardwoods including tanoak, bigleaf maple, red alder, and Pacific madrone are common. Manzanita, hazelnut, vine maple, western skunk cabbage, and multiple species of berries and grasses make up the understory. Kalmiopsis, a flowering evergreen shrub and the namesake of the Kalmiopsis Wilderness, only grows in the Siskiyou Mountains. Several noxious weeds have also been identified, including gorse, Scotch broom, blackberries, and thistles.

The most prevalent species of the extreme southern portion of the watershed is the coastal redwood, one of the tallest types of trees on Earth. The redwoods were heavily logged in the early 20th century. Prior to logging, the massive trees created their own microclimate by capturing moisture from fog, and also by the immense amount of shade they produced. The redwoods region is less mountainous than the rest of the watershed, and meandering streams are much more common.

Over 200 species of animals inhabit the river and its tributaries. Birds such as loons, grebes, ducks, kingfishers, and bald eagles are known to live around streams and other regions of the watershed. Auks, gulls, and terns have been spotted around the river's mouth, and black-legged kittiwakes nest in the area during the winter. The wildlife in the Kalmiopsis region of the Chetco watershed is more diverse than that of any other region in Oregon. Mammals such as American black bears, black-tailed deer, bobcats, ring-tailed cats, and gray foxes are common inhabitants of this region. The rare Siskiyou chipmunk is endemic to the Klamath Mountains. Steelhead and chinook and coho salmon are the most common anadromous fish that inhabit the Chetco River. Steelhead are abundant and have been spotted in most major and minor streams. Chinook salmon usually travel as far as Boulder Creek, about halfway between the Chetco's headwaters and its mouth. Coastal cutthroat trout can be found all around the watershed; some migrate to the ocean, while others live in the river and its tributaries year round. Pacific lamprey, three-spined stickleback, and various sculpins have also been observed.

Geology

The Chetco River flows through the ancient Klamath Mountain terrane, which is between 400 and 100 million years old, the oldest rocks in Oregon. The Klamath microcontinent was originally located beneath the ocean near southern California before separating hundreds of millions of years ago. Plate tectonics pushed the microcontinent north, and bits of granite, sea floor sediment, subduction zones, and coral reefs gradually accreted into small islands. Between 212 and 170 million years ago, a massive volcanic arc erupted on the Klamath microcontinent, binding the islands together in a single block. The Klamath microcontinent went through a period of intense tectonic activity known as the Siskiyou orogeny roughly 170 to 165 million years ago. The process was strong enough to force sedimentary rocks deep into the Earth's crust, melting them into large plutons of granite, which rose slowly to the surface. Shortly after, a large portion of sea floor was thrust over the older Klamath terranes; much of it is still visible atop Vulcan and Chetco peaks. This region is known as the Josephine Ophiolite, and contains a rare type of rock called peridotite, originating from the Earth's mantle.

The mountainous terrain of the Chetco River watershed was created approximately 130 million years ago when the microcontinent collided with the much larger North American continent. The process uplifted the complex and exotic terranes of the microcontinent to form the Klamath Mountains. Many glaciers carved U-shaped valleys and cirques during the last ice age, and several alpine lakes still exist today.

Today, sandstone, shale, granite, and serpentine are the primary rock types in the Chetco region. Various forms of loam comprise its soil. Erosion levels are high due to a combination of high precipitation, steep slopes, and landslides, which can result in earthflows.

History

Humans have lived in the Chetco River watershed since approximately 1,000 to 3,000 years ago. The first inhabitants were perhaps ancestors of the Chetco Indians and other Native American tribes, themselves descendants of the first humans who traveled across the Bering land bridge from Siberia over 10,000 years ago. At least nine separate villages were constructed along the Chetco River, including two on either side of its mouth. The Native Americans named the river "chit taa-ghii~-li~'".

The first European American to visit the area may have been Sir Francis Drake on June 5, 1579, during his circumnavigation of the world. The Vancouver Expedition also explored the area in 1792. In June 1828 Jedediah Smith and his company of fur traders camped on the south bank of the river near a Native American village. Between 1853 and 1855, many Native Americans were killed and their villages destroyed in skirmishes occurring around the same time as the nearby Rogue River Wars. On July 9, 1856, the remaining Chetco were marched north to the Siletz Reservation.

Oregon—and therefore the Chetco watershed—was jointly occupied by the United Kingdom and the United States after the Treaty of 1818 was signed. The Oregon Treaty was ratified in 1846, giving the United States ownership of Oregon. Soon after, the Oregon Territory was established, and Oregon became a U.S. state on February 14, 1859.

The discovery of gold and other precious metals in the watershed brought settlers to the region in the 1840s and 1850s. Nickel, cobalt, and chromium were also mined. The town of Harbor was founded on the south bank of the Chetco River in 1891, and a ferry service across the river opened in 1904. It was shut down in 1915 when the Chetco Bridge opened. In 1912, the Brookings Lumber & Box Company moved north from the San Bernardino Mountains in southern California to the southern Oregon coast region. The company constructed a sawmill in 1914, and founded the town of Brookings. Brookings was not incorporated until 1951. The region remained relatively isolated due to its mountainous terrain until 1924, when Highway 101 was extended from Crescent City, California, to Brookings. In 1932, the Isaac Lee Patterson Bridge was completed over the Rogue River to the north, connecting the region to the rest of the Oregon coast. In 1917, a  wharf was built at the mouth of the river. Jetties were constructed on either side of its mouth by the United States Army Corps of Engineers in 1957.

The Siskiyou National Forest was created on October 5, 1906, protecting the entire upper portion of the Chetco watershed. The nearby Rogue River National Forest was combined with it in 2004, creating the nearly  Rogue River – Siskiyou National Forest.

On October 28, 1988, a  stretch of the Chetco River was designated a National Wild and Scenic River, from its headwaters to the boundary of the Rogue River – Siskiyou National Forest. In a court case in 1994, the Chetco was determined to be navigable. Originally five separate fires, it was caused by several lightning strikes between July 12 and 15. By August 17, all five had burned together, creating one massive fire. It burned for over five months and was not fully extinguished until December 31.

In 2002,  of land on the Little Chetco River were sold to Washington real estate developer David Rutan, only several months after the Biscuit Fire tore through the region. He opened a gold mining camp on the site in 2007, flying in customers by helicopter. Curry County officials soon stated that the camp violated zoning and sanitation laws, but inspections were stymied because of the area's inaccessibility. Despite environmentalists' concerns, he proposed mining the Chetco riverbed for gold and minerals via commercial suction dredges, permitted by the General Mining Act of 1872. In 2010, the Chetco River was identified as the seventh most endangered river in America by advocacy organization American Rivers, facing a threat of "motorized instream mining". Oregon's governor, Ted Kulongoski, two senators, Ron Wyden and Jeff Merkley, and congressman Peter DeFazio all asked the United States Department of Agriculture to withdraw the Chetco River from the 1872 Mining Act, thus preventing mineral mining on the river. However, Rutan forfeited his claims by not paying his annual filing fees to the Bureau of Land Management in 2011.

Pollution

The Oregon Department of Environmental Quality (DEQ) has monitored the Chetco River for eight different parameters that affect water quality: temperature, oxygen saturation, pH, nutrients, bacteria, chemical contaminants such as pesticides and metals, turbidity, and alkalinity. Streams that exceed the standard level are then placed on the DEQ 303d list in accordance with the Clean Water Act. The Chetco from Box Canyon Creek to its mouth exceeded the standard level for temperature and turbidity. The North Fork, South Fork, and other tributaries were also listed for temperature and turbidity. All tributaries of the Chetco usually exceed the  temperature standard. High turbidity levels in the Chetco River watershed are usually caused by landslides, various forms of erosion, and plugged road culverts.

On the Oregon Water Quality Index (OWQI) used by DEQ, water quality scores can vary from 10 (worst) to 100 (ideal). The average for the Chetco River at RM 10.8 (RK 17.4) between 1998 and 2007 was 95 (excellent) in the summer and 90 in the fall, winter, and spring. These scores are comparable to the 1986 to 1995 results of 94 and 93. Despite the excellent ratings, the Chetco River actually ranks as the second most polluted stream in Curry County, after Floras Creek, a tributary of the New River.

Recreation
Fishing, four-wheel driving, swimming, boating, camping, sightseeing, and picnicking are the primary recreational activities in the watershed. Whitewater kayaking is also popular in the winter months when water levels are high. Several trails are maintained throughout the Kalmiopsis Wilderness, as well as other regions in the watershed. Eight boat launches are located on the river between its confluence with the south fork and its mouth. Alfred A. Loeb State Park, located on the banks of the Chetco, has three cabins and 48 camping sites.

Several large parks are located in Brookings. The  Azalea Park in Brookings features five species of wild azaleas. The park was designated an Oregon State Park in 1939, but was given to Brookings in 1993. It hosts the American Music Festival from June until September. The Nature's Coastal Holiday light show is displayed in Azalea Park every December. Chetco Point Park, located near the wharf, has several fire rings and picnic tables, as well as views of the river, the Pacific Ocean, and the Port of Brookings Harbor. It is home to the rare Wolf's Evening Primrose.

See also
 List of rivers of Oregon
 List of longest streams of Oregon
 List of National Wild and Scenic Rivers

Notes and references
Notes

References

Bibliography

Books

News articles

Websites

Other

External links

Rivers of Oregon
Rivers of Curry County, Oregon
Drainage basins of the Pacific Ocean
Rogue River-Siskiyou National Forest
Wild and Scenic Rivers of the United States